The white-faced starling (Sturnornis albofrontatus) is a member of the starling family of birds. It is an endemic resident breeder in Sri Lanka. It was for a long time erroneously known as S. senex; this was eventually identified as a junior synonym of the red-billed starling (Mees 1997).

The adults of these 22 cm-long birds have green-glossed dark grey upperparts and whitish underparts. The head is paler than the underparts. The sexes are similar, but juveniles are duller, with brown upperparts and greyer underparts.

As the genus Sturnus is highly paraphyletic, it was not certain whether the present species would be retained therein. Though it was not included in recent studies (Jønsson & Fjeldså 2006, Zuccon et al. 2006), its appearance suggests it is not close to the common starling, the type species of Sturnus. It is also generally not included among those species which are often (and probably correctly) placed in Acridotheres.  Most taxonomic authorities place the species in its own genus, Sturnornis.

This passerine is typically found in tall forest, usually high in the canopy. The white-faced starling builds its nest in a hole. The normal clutch is two eggs.

Like most starlings, the white-faced starling is fairly omnivorous, eating fruit, nectar and insects.

References

 Database entry includes brief justification for why this species is Vulnerable.
Grimmett, Richard; Inskipp, Carol, Inskipp, Tim & Byers, Clive (1999): Birds of India, Pakistan, Nepal, Bangladesh, Bhutan, Sri Lanka, and the Maldives. Princeton University Press, Princeton, N.J.. 
Jønsson, Knud A. & Fjeldså, Jon (2006): A phylogenetic supertree of oscine passerine birds (Aves: Passeri). Zool. Scripta 35(2): 149–186.  (HTML abstract)
Mees, G.F. (1997): On the identity of Heterornis senex Bonaparte. Bull. B. O. C. 117(1): 67–68.
Zuccon, Dario; Cibois, Alice; Pasquet, Eric & Ericson, Per G.P. (2006): Nuclear and mitochondrial sequence data reveal the major lineages of starlings, mynas and related taxa. Molecular Phylogenetics and Evolution 41(2): 333–344.   (HTML abstract)

white-faced starling
Endemic birds of Sri Lanka
white-faced starling
Taxa named by Edgar Leopold Layard